Andrew Neal Allanson (born December 22, 1961), is a former professional baseball catcher who played in Major League Baseball (MLB) for eight seasons, from 1986 to 1995. Andy was signed as a second-round pick in the 1983 amateur draft, by the Cleveland Indians and scout Bobby Malkmus.

Amateur career
Allanson attended the University of Richmond. In 1982 he played collegiate summer baseball with the Harwich Mariners of the Cape Cod Baseball League and was named a league all-star.

Professional career
Allanson would break into the Major Leagues on April 7, 1986, starting Opening Day behind the plate for the Indians.  He went 3–4 with one run batted in, helping the Indians defeat the Baltimore Orioles 6–4.  A lithe, take-charge catcher, Allanson's handling of the 1986 Cleveland pitching staff was in part responsible for the Indians resurgent, 84–78 mark. He was named the Topps All-Rookie catcher. Despite his size (6'5", 220 lbs), Allanson did not hit a home run until his 1,025th pro at-bat, in the Kingdome that June 23. The Indians, feeling they were perhaps a better-hitting, veteran catcher away from contention, signed Rick Dempsey for 1987, demoting Allanson. Cleveland finished last (61–101), and Allanson was again the starting catcher in 1988.

The acquisition of Joel Skinner before the 1989 season again cut into Allanson's playing time, and when the team traded for Sandy Alomar Jr. in December 1989, it was clear Allanson's starting days were over. He was released the following spring, and was picked up by the Texas Rangers a few days later.  Allanson was released in May, and did not play for any other club that year.

He was picked up by the Kansas City Royals in January 1991, and was traded to the Detroit Tigers before the season started.  Allanson played 60 games for the Tigers, backing up Mickey Tettleton behind the plate, and became a free agent after the season.  He signed with the Milwaukee Brewers for the 1992 season, and joined the San Francisco Giants in 1993.  However, he only played 24 games during that two-year span, and would not appear in the Major Leagues again until 1995 with the California Angels, playing in 35 games.

References

External links

1961 births
Living people
Major League Baseball catchers
Baseball players from Richmond, Virginia
Cleveland Indians players
Detroit Tigers players
Milwaukee Brewers players
San Francisco Giants players
California Angels players
Buffalo Bisons (minor league) players
Phoenix Firebirds players
Waterbury Indians players
Batavia Trojans players
Oklahoma City 89ers players
Vancouver Canadians players
American expatriate baseball players in Canada
Denver Zephyrs players
Salinas Spurs players
San Bernardino Spirit players
Richmond Spiders baseball players
Long Beach Riptide players
All-American college baseball players
Waterloo Indians players
Lake Elsinore Storm players
Harwich Mariners players